Haemaphysalis concinna is a common rodent tick species that originally predominantly occurred in Russia and Eastern Europe, but is also known from Japan, China, Germany and France.

It is known to act as a vector of tickborne disease.

Description
Females reach a length of three to four mm, but can grow up to ten mm when engorged; males are about three mm long. An unfed nymph is under two mm long. There are more males than females.

Development
All three stages target different hosts, the eggs are laid on the ground. They mate on their host around April.

Feeding behavior
Nymphs and larvae feed on small mammals such as rodents or hedgehogs, or on birds, reptiles, and humans. Adults prefer larger mammals, ranging from cats to horses, again including humans.

Diseases
H. concinna can act as a vector for Francisella tularensis (tularaemia), Rickettsia sibirica (Siberian tick typhus), Rickettsia heilongjiangensis (Far-Eastern spotted fever), Virus of Russian spring-summer encephalitis (RSSE) and tick-borne encephalitis (TBE).

References

External links
 Systematik von Zecken: List of all described Haemaphysalis species
 Tick Identification Key: Identification of adults in genus Haemaphysalis

Ticks
Animals described in 1844
Arachnids of Asia
Ixodidae